Cassiopeia (Ancient Greek: Κασσιόπεια Kassiópeia or  Kassiópē) or Cassiepeia (Κασσιέπεια Kassiépeia), a figure in Greek mythology, was Queen of Aethiopia and wife of King Cepheus. She was arrogant and vain, characteristics that led to her downfall.

Family 
Her origins are obscure. Nonnus calls her a nymph, while according to Stephanus, she was called Iope, the daughter of Aeolus, from whom the town of Joppa (now the Jaffa neighborhood in Tel Aviv) derived its name.

Mythology 
Cassiopeia boasted that she and her daughter Andromeda were more beautiful than all the Nereids, the nymph-daughters of the sea god Nereus. This brought the wrath of Poseidon, ruling god of the sea, upon the kingdom of Ethiopia.

Accounts differ as to whether Poseidon decided to flood the whole country or direct the sea monster Cetus to destroy it. In either case, trying to save their kingdom, Cepheus and Cassiopeia consulted a wise oracle, who told them that the only way to appease the sea gods was to sacrifice their daughter.

Accordingly, Andromeda was chained to a rock at the sea's edge and left to be killed by the sea monster. Perseus arrives to kill Cetus, saves Andromeda and marries her.

Poseidon thought Cassiopeia should not escape punishment, so he placed her in the heavens chained to a throne in a position that referenced Andromeda's ordeal. The constellation resembles the chair that originally represented an instrument of torture. Cassiopeia is not always represented tied to the chair in torment; in some later drawings she holds a mirror, symbol of her vanity, while in others she holds a palm frond.

Constellation
The constellation Cassiopeia, near to the pole star, can be seen from latitudes north of 35°N during the whole year. The constellation is also visible in countries north of the Tropic of Capricorn, in late spring.

Ethiopian tradition
Some Ethiopian king lists mention Cassiopeia as a ruling queen of Ethiopia. According to a king list presented by prince Tafari Makonnen, she ruled as part of the Agdazyan dynasty and reigned for 19 years from 1890 to 1871 BC, with dates following the Ethiopian calendar.

See also 
Lists of stars by constellation
List of legendary monarchs of Ethiopia

Notes

References 

 Aratus Solensis, Phaenomena translated by G. R. Mair. Loeb Classical Library Volume 129. London: William Heinemann, 1921. Online version at the Topos Text Project.
 Aratus Solensis, Phaenomena. G. R. Mair. London: William Heinemann; New York: G.P. Putnam's Sons. 1921. Greek text available at the Perseus Digital Library.
 Gaius Julius Hyginus, Astronomica from The Myths of Hyginus translated and edited by Mary Grant. University of Kansas Publications in Humanistic Studies. Online version at the Topos Text Project.
 Gaius Julius Hyginus, Fabulae from The Myths of Hyginus translated and edited by Mary Grant. University of Kansas Publications in Humanistic Studies. Online version at the Topos Text Project.
 Nonnus of Panopolis, Dionysiaca translated by William Henry Denham Rouse (1863-1950), from the Loeb Classical Library, Cambridge, MA, Harvard University Press, 1940.  Online version at the Topos Text Project.
 Nonnus of Panopolis, Dionysiaca. 3 Vols. W.H.D. Rouse. Cambridge, MA., Harvard University Press; London, William Heinemann, Ltd. 1940–1942. Greek text available at the Perseus Digital Library.
 Pseudo-Apollodorus, The Library with an English Translation by Sir James George Frazer, F.B.A., F.R.S. in 2 Volumes, Cambridge, MA, Harvard University Press; London, William Heinemann Ltd. 1921. Online version at the Perseus Digital Library. Greek text available from the same website.
 Stephanus of Byzantium, Stephani Byzantii Ethnicorum quae supersunt, edited by August Meineike (1790-1870), published 1849. A few entries from this important ancient handbook of place names have been translated by Brady Kiesling. Online version at the Topos Text Project.

Princesses in Greek mythology
Queens in Greek mythology
Ethiopian characters in Greek mythology
Deeds of Poseidon